Naranjan S. Dhalla,  (born October 10, 1936) is a Canadian cardiovascular research scientist focusing on cardiovascular pathophysiology and therapy of heart disease. His laboratory employs a variety of experimental models to investigate a wide range of cardiovascular diseases at the subcellular and molecular levels.

Born in Ghanieke, Punjab, India, he received a Bachelor of Science in Physics and Chemistry from Panjab University in 1956, an A.I.C. in Chemistry from the Institution of Chemists in Calcutta, India in 1961, a Master of Science in Pharmacology from University of Pennsylvania in 1963, and a Ph.D. in Pharmacology from University of Pennsylvania in 1965. In 1968, he joined the University of Manitoba as an assistant professor in physiology. In 1972, he became an associate professor and a full professor in 1974. In 1991, he was appointed a distinguished professor of physiology. From 1996 to 2006, he was the director of St. Boniface Hospital Research Centre's Institute of Cardiovascular Sciences. He last served as executive director of the International Academy of Cardiovascular Sciences.

Dhalla also served the International Society for Heart Research as secretary general from 1972 to 1988, and as president elect, president, and past president from 1989 to 1998. He is credited for expanding the reach of the ISHR by establishing chapters in Russia, China, Japan, India, South America and in many other countries of the world.

Awards and honors
In 1996, he was awarded Manitoba's Order of the Buffalo Hunt and the Order of Manitoba in 2002. In 1997, he was made a member of the Order of Canada, Canada's highest civilian honour, for having "distinguished himself in the field of cardiovascular research". In 2000, he was made a fellow of the Royal Society of Canada. In 2007, he was granted heraldic arms from the Canadian Heraldic Authority with the motto "Satayam Shivam Sundaram" or "Truth Purity Beauty". In 2009, Dhalla was awarded an honorary doctorate from Panjab University, Chandigarh, India.

References

Sources
 
 
 
  
 

1936 births
Living people
Canadian medical researchers
Indian emigrants to Canada
Fellows of the Royal Society of Canada
Members of the Order of Canada
Members of the Order of Manitoba
Punjabi people
Academic staff of the University of Manitoba
Perelman School of Medicine at the University of Pennsylvania alumni
Canadian people of Indian descent